Henry Lowther may refer to:

Henry Lowther, 3rd Viscount Lonsdale (1694–1751), English courtier and landowner
Henry Lowther, 3rd Earl of Lonsdale (1818–1876), British nobleman and Conservative politician
Henry Lowther (politician) (1790–1867), British Conservative politician
Henry Lowther (diplomat) (1858–1939), British ambassador to Chile and Denmark
Henry Lowther (musician) (born 1941), English jazz trumpeter